Chengdu railway station is a major railway station in Chengdu, the capital of Sichuan province. The station is located on North Second Ring Road, Jinniu District, to the North of the city centre. It is operated by China Railway Chengdu Group and is one of the most important hubs of the railway network in China.

Chengdu railway station can be reached by taking Chengdu Metro Line 1 and Line 7 and the Chengdu BRT.

From 11 October 2022, the station will be closed for refurbishment with passenger services diverted to other stations in Chengdu. It will be served by Chengdu–Chongqing Central line high-speed railway when the renovation completed.

Naming Custom 
This railway station is commonly called by locals as "" (North railway station), as the connecting Chengdu Metro station is called.

Connections
Chengdu railway station is the terminus of the Baoji–Chengdu railway, Chengdu–Chongqing railway, Chengdu–Kunming railway, Chengdu–Dujiangyan high-speed railway, and Dazhou–Chengdu railway.

Chengdu Metro

North Railway Station is a transfer station on Line 1 and Line 7 of the Chengdu Metro. It serves the Chengdu railway station.

Gallery

References

External links

Stations on the Chengdu–Dujiangyan Intercity Railway
Stations on the Chengdu–Chongqing Railway
Stations on the Chengdu–Kunming Railway
Stations on the Chengdu West Ring Railway
Stations on the Baoji–Chengdu Railway
Stations on the Dazhou–Chengdu Railway
Chengdu Metro stations